Systematics may mean:

 Systematics, the study of the diversity of organism characteristics
 Systematics – study of multi-term systems, the study of the inherent properties of systems with varying number of terms - monad, dyad, triad, etc. - developed by John G. Bennett and others
 Systematic Paris-Region, a French business cluster devoted to complex systems
 Systematic theology, a discipline of Christian theology
 Systematics, Inc - a data processing company founded in 1968 by Arkansas superinvestor Jackson T. Stephens

See also

System (disambiguation)
Systematic (disambiguation)